Similar to a World War II reenactment, Korean War reenactments can be divided into two categories, "living history" or a public-oriented display (generally part of a larger venue) or as a "tactical event", a closed event where participants re-create a battle or event of the war.

Living history
In this type of event, participants set up a display attempting to show the public a small part of what soldiers, naval infantry, sailors or airmen experienced during the war. Such displays normally focus on the "material culture" of the military during the war, with tents, vehicles, weapons, and other everyday items on display in as close to their original context as possible. Participants in uniform are generally available to answer questions or perform period activities for public observation.

Tactical re-enactment
In this form of Korean War re-enactment, participants attempt to "walk in the shoes" of a Korean War soldier, and simulate the experience as completely as possible with all its discomforts, but without physical danger. While other re-enactors may be portraying Chinese or North Korean soldiers, Korean War events lack the competitive "win or lose" wargaming aspect of more mainstream World War II re-enactments, and tend to be much more scripted. Participants are generally required to create a persona and remain "in character" throughout the event.

The first such event documented was held in North Vernon, Indiana, by members of the 20th Century Tactical Studies Group portraying Canadian and North Korean troops on March 15, 1997.

References

External links
Korean War re-enactor forum
5th RCT Korean War Re-enactors in Florida
 Dutch Korean War Reenactment group, NDVN 
 French Korean War re-eactment forum and group reenacting the French contingent in Korea, the BF ONU

Reenactment of the late modern period
Works about the Korean War
Historical reenactment by war